Brookings County Courthouse, located at the intersection of 4th St. and 6th Ave. in Brookings, is Brookings County, South Dakota's county courthouse. The courthouse was built in 1912 to replace the county's original courthouse, which was constructed in 1883. Architects C. E. Bell, Tyrie & Chapman designed the courthouse in the Renaissance Revival style, which was common in early 20th century buildings. The J. B. Nelson Construction Company built the courthouse.

The courthouse was added to the National Register of Historic Places on December 12, 1976. In 2011, the county began a $1 million renovation of the courthouse in order to meet the local circuit court's needs.

References

Courthouses on the National Register of Historic Places in South Dakota
Renaissance Revival architecture in South Dakota
County courthouses in South Dakota
Government buildings completed in 1912
Buildings and structures in Brookings County, South Dakota
1912 establishments in South Dakota
National Register of Historic Places in Brookings County, South Dakota